is a 1994 Japanese comedy film directed by Yoji Yamada. It stars Kiyoshi Atsumi as Torajirō Kuruma (Tora-san), and Rino Katase as his love interest or "Madonna". Tora-san's Easy Advice is the forty-seventh entry in the popular, long-running Otoko wa Tsurai yo series.

Cast
 Kiyoshi Atsumi as Torajirō
 Chieko Baisho as Sakura
 Hidetaka Yoshioka as Mitsuo Suwa
 Riho Makise as Nao Kawai
 Rino Katase as Noriko
 Shimojo Masami as Kuruma Tatsuzō
 Chieko Misaki as Tsune Kuruma (Torajirō's aunt)
 Masato Yamada as Shinobu Kawai
 Hisao Dazai as Boss (Umetarō Katsura)
 Gajirō Satō as Genkō

Critical appraisal
The German-language site molodezhnaja gives Tora-san's Easy Advice three out of five stars.

Availability
Tora-san's Easy Advice was released theatrically on December 23, 1994. In Japan, the film was released on videotape in 1996, and in DVD format in 2002 and 2008.

References

Bibliography

English

German

Japanese

External links
 Tora-san's Easy Advice at www.tora-san.jp (official site)

1994 films
Films directed by Yoji Yamada
1994 comedy films
1990s Japanese-language films
Otoko wa Tsurai yo films
Japanese sequel films
Shochiku films
Films set in Kamakura
Films set in Shiga Prefecture
Films set in Nagasaki Prefecture
Films set in Niigata Prefecture
Films with screenplays by Yôji Yamada
1990s Japanese films